Dinarabad (also Romanized as Dīnārābād) is a village in Khalazir Rural District, Aftab District, Tehran County, Tehran Province, Iran. At the 2006 census, its population was 116, in 28 families.

References 

Populated places in Tehran County